Wonsan-class minelayer (Hangul 원산급 기뢰부설함, Hanja: 元山級機雷敷設艦) is a one-ship class of minelayers currently in service on the Republic of Korea Navy.

The Republic of Korea Navy planned to commission three Wonsan class mine layers. However, due to budget problems, only one was commissioned.

Ships in the class

References

See also
Republic of Korea Navy

Mine warfare vessels of the Republic of Korea Navy
Minelayers
Mine warfare vessel classes